Garstang and Catterall railway station served as the interchange between the Garstang and Knot-End Railway and the London and North Western Railway, in Lancashire, England. The station was in the parish of Barnacre-with-Bonds, close to the village of Catterall, adjacent to the Lancaster Canal, and opposite the Kenlis Arms Pub.

This station was on the Lancaster and Preston Junction Railway (now part of the West Coast Main Line) between Preston and Lancaster. It opened on 26 June 1840, originally named Garstang Station. It was the last of the stations between Preston and Lancaster to close, on 3 February 1969.

The station had a platform for each direction of the main line, and a third platform for the single-track branch line to Pilling and Knott End.

References

Disused railway stations in the Borough of Wyre
Railway stations in Great Britain opened in 1840
Railway stations in Great Britain closed in 1969
Beeching closures in England
Former London and North Western Railway stations